All India Institute of Medical Sciences, Vijaypur, Jammu (AIIMS Vijaypur) is a public institute of national importance. The Public Medical School and Hospital based in Vijaypur Town of Samba District of Jammu Division of Indian state of Jammu and Kashmir and one of the All India Institutes of Medical Sciences (AIIMSs). On 3 February 2019 Prime Minister Narendra Modi laid the foundation stone of the institute.

Academics
The institute became operational with the first batch of 50 MBBS students, one of the four AIIMS(s) to become operational in academic year 2020-21.The seats capacity was further increased with an intake of 62 MBBS students  in academic year 2021-22.

References

All India Institutes of Medical Sciences
Educational institutions established in 2020
2020 establishments in Jammu and Kashmir
Medical colleges in Jammu and Kashmir